Skew Siskin is the debut studio album by the German hard rock band Skew Siskin, released in 1992.

Track listing

Personnel

Band members
Nina C. Alice - lead and backing vocals, keyboards on track 5
Jim Voxx - guitar, keyboards on track 7, producer, engineer, mixing
Jogy Rautenberg - bass
Nik Terry - drums, percussion

Additional musicians
Thomas Glanz - keyboards on track 7, Hammond organ on track 9

Production
Arranged by Skew Siskin
Additional engineering by Jogy Rautenberg, Nik Terry, Nina C. Alice, Will Roper
Tracks: 2, 3, 6, 12 mixed by Brian Malouf, assisted by Pat MacDougall at Can-Am Recorders, Tarzana, California
Art direction and design by Hugh Syme
Paintings by Marshall Arisman
Mastered by George Marino at Sterling Sound, New York

References

1992 debut albums
Giant Records (Warner) albums